Stuffed intestines, (( is a dish of Kurdish origin called Bumbar/Mumbar. The main ingredients are minced meat, cow or lamb's intestines, rice, tomato paste, onion, chickpeas, salt, black pepper, allspice, and cinnamon.

In, Israeli cuisine, stuffed intestines is sometimes being used in a slow cooked Hamin dish for shabbat.

See also
 Mumbar (food)
 List of lamb dishes
 List of stuffed dishes

References

Arab cuisine
Israeli cuisine
Lebanese cuisine
Lamb dishes